24th BSFC Awards
December 14, 2003

Best Film: 
 Mystic River 
The 24th Boston Society of Film Critics Awards, honoring the best in filmmaking in 2003, were given on 14 December 2003.

Winners

Best Film:
Mystic River
Runner-up: Lost in Translation
Best Actor:
Bill Murray – Lost in Translation
Runner-up: Sean Penn – Mystic River
Best Actress:
Scarlett Johansson – Lost in Translation
Runner-up: Naomi Watts – 21 Grams
Best Supporting Actor:
Peter Sarsgaard – Shattered Glass
Runner-up: Alec Baldwin – The Cooler
Best Supporting Actress:
Patricia Clarkson – Pieces of April and The Station Agent
Runner-up: Ludivine Sagnier – Swimming Pool
Best Director:
Sofia Coppola – Lost in Translation
Runner-up: Peter Jackson – The Lord of the Rings: The Return of the King
Best Screenplay:
Shari Springer Berman and Robert Pulcini – American Splendor
Runner-up: Sofia Coppola – Lost in Translation
Best Cinematography:
Olli Barbé et al. – Winged Migration (Le peuple migrateur)
Runner-up: Benoît Debie and Gaspar Noé – Irréversible
Best Documentary:
Capturing the Friedmans
Runner-up: The Fog of War
Best Foreign-Language Film:
The Triplets of Belleville (Les triplettes de Belleville) • France/Canada/Belgium
Runner-up: Irréversible • France
Best New Filmmaker:
Andrew Jarecki – Capturing the Friedmans
Runner-up: Sylvain Chomet – The Triplets of Belleville (Les triplettes de Belleville)
Best Ensemble Cast:
Mystic River
Runner-up: A Mighty Wind

References
Boston crix go misty over ‘Mystic River’ Variety
Boston critics name 'Mystic River' best picture Boston Globe
'River' Bank Entertainment Weekly

External links
Past Winners

2003
2003 film awards
2003 awards in the United States
2003 in Boston
December 2003 events in the United States